Iván Iglesias Corteguera (born 16 December 1971) is a Spanish former footballer who played as a midfielder.

Club career
Born in Gijón, Asturias, Iglesias started playing professionally with local Sporting de Gijón. After only two seasons – and only appearing regularly in the second – he was signed by La Liga club FC Barcelona in summer 1993, after agreeing to a five-year contract.

Never an undisputed starter at the Camp Nou, Iglesias did make 71 competitive appearances in his two-year spell. On 8 January 1994 he closed the scoring for Johan Cruyff's side against Real Madrid, in a 5–0 home rout as Barcelona eventually clinched the league title.

Iglesias then returned to Sporting for another campaign, appearing sparingly, after which he switched to neighbouring Real Oviedo where he would stay four years, always in the top flight. He retired in June 2002 aged 30 while at Rayo Vallecano in the same league, due to injuries, totalling 230 games and 21 goals over 11 seasons.

Iglesias later opened a football school with former Sporting teammate Juanele.

Honours
Barcelona
La Liga: 1993–94
Supercopa de España: 1994
UEFA Champions League runner-up: 1993–94

References

External links

1971 births
Living people
Spanish footballers
Footballers from Gijón
Association football midfielders
La Liga players
Segunda División B players
Tercera División players
Sporting de Gijón B players
Sporting de Gijón players
FC Barcelona players
Real Oviedo players
Rayo Vallecano players
FC Cartagena footballers
Spain under-21 international footballers